Achachi is a  type of Peruvian embroidery (bordado) from the Altiplano.

References

Embroidery